Esmeralda is a steel-hulled four-masted barquentine tall ship of the Chilean Navy.

Construction 

The ship is the sixth to carry the name Esmeralda. The first was the frigate Esmeralda captured from the Spanish at Callao, Peru, by Admiral Lord Thomas Cochrane of the Chilean Navy, in a bold incursion on the night of 5 November 1820. The second was the corvette Esmeralda of the Chilean Navy, which, set against superior forces, fought until sunk with colors flying on 21 May 1879 at the Battle of Iquique. These events mark important milestones for the Chilean Navy, and the ship's name is said to evoke its values of courage and sacrifice.

Construction began in Cádiz, Spain, in 1946. She was intended to become Spain's national training ship. During her construction in 1947 the yard in which she was being built suffered catastrophic explosions, which damaged the ship and placed the yard on the brink of bankruptcy. Work on the ship was temporarily halted. In 1950 Chile and Spain entered into negotiations in which Spain offered to repay debts incurred to Chile as a result of the Spanish Civil War in the form of manufactured products, including the not yet completed Esmeralda. Chile accepted the offer, and the ship was formally transferred to the ownership of Chile in 1951. Work then continued on the ship. She was finally launched on 12 May 1953 before an audience of 5,000 people. She was christened by Mrs. Raquel Vicuña de Orrego using a bottle wrapped in the national colors of Spain and Chile. She was delivered as a four-masted topsail schooner to the Government of Chile on 15 June 1954, Captain Horacio Cornejo Tagle in command.

Her sister ship is the training ship for the Spanish Navy, the four-masted topsail schooner Juan Sebastián de Elcano. Sometime in the 1970s, Esmeralda's rigging was changed to a four-masted barquentine by replacing the fore gaffsail (course sail) by two main staysails. The third (top) main staysail is still in place. She has now five staysails, three topsails, six jibbs, three course gaff sails, four square sails, 21 all in all.

Voyages 

Her first voyage was to the Canary Islands and then on to New Orleans, where a distillation plant was installed. She then proceeded through the Panama Canal and arrived at  Valparaíso on 1 September 1954 to much fanfare.

Since her commissioning, Esmeralda has been a training ship for the Chilean Navy. She has visited more than 300 ports worldwide, acting as a floating embassy for Chile. She participated in Operation Sail at New York City in 1964, 1976 and 1986, and the Osaka World Sail in 1983. She also participated in International Regattas of Sail in 1964, 1976, 1982 and 1990 winning the Cutty Sark Trophy in the last two participations.

In 2016, Esmeralda visited New Zealand to participate in the 75th Anniversary Celebrations of the foundation of the Royal New Zealand Navy.

In 2019, Esmeralda visited Singapore in light of the APEC Chile 2019.

Prison and torture centre 

Reports from Amnesty International, the US Senate and Chilean Truth and Reconciliation Commission describe the ship as a kind of floating jail and torture chamber for political prisoners of the Augusto Pinochet regime from 1973 to 1990. It is claimed that probably over a hundred persons were kept there at times and subjected to hideous treatment, among them British priest Michael Woodward, who later died as a result of torture.

Due to this dark part of its history, the international voyages of the Esmeralda are often highly controversial - especially at the time when Pinochet was still in power but even after the restoration of Chilean democracy. The ship's arrival in various ports is accompanied by protests and demonstrations by local political groups and Chilean left-wing political exiles. Such protest actions were recorded, among other places, at Amsterdam, Dartmouth,  Quebec, Vancouver and Victoria, British Columbia, Wellington, Piraeus and Haifa, as well as at Santiago in Chile itself.

General characteristics
Length: 109.8 metres
Beam: 13.11 metres
Maximum draught: 7 metres
Stanchion: 8.7 metres
Gunwale height: 5.3 metres
Maximum displacement: 3,754 tons
Maximum engine speed: 13 knots
Maximum sail speed: 17.5 knots
Armament: 4 × 57 mm ceremonial gun mounts
Crew: 300 sailors, 90 midshipmen
Sails: 29 total with a sail area of 2,870 m², on four masts
Mast height: 48.5 metres

See also
 Esmeralda (1884)
 List of large sailing vessels

References

External links

"Esmeralda" website
Documentary film The Dark Side of the White Lady
WHNL (Honolulu) report on Esmeralda Hawai'i visit
Pinochet's torture ship sails into Sydney, sparking protests The Guardian, 2016

Training ships
Military history of Chile
Prison ships
Individual sailing vessels
Tall ships of Chile
Barquentines
Four-masted ships
Ships built in Spain
1953 ships
Ships of the Chilean Navy
Torture in Chile